Nikolaos Kriezotis (1785–1853) was a Greek soldier who served as a leader during the Greek War of Independence in Euboea.

Biography

An Arvanite, Kriezotis was general officer in the Greek revolutionary army and is credited with being one of the leaders of the 1822 First Siege of Missolonghi, fought against the Ottomans, who were led by Omer Vrioni. Kriezotis had earlier participated in the siege of Athens reinforcing the siege of the Acropolis. In 1829 he participated in the Battle of Petra, the last battle of the Greek Revolution. After the revolution he joined the Russian Party.

He led the Revolution of 1843 in Euboea and the following year was elected a delegate to the First National Assembly and to the first Parliament after that. 

Kriezotis then withdrew to Smyrna, where he died in 1853.

References

19th-century Greek military personnel
1785 births
1853 deaths
Eastern Orthodox Christians from Greece
Greek generals
Greek military leaders of the Greek War of Independence
Greek MPs 1844–1847
People from Euboea (regional unit)
Members of the Royal Phalanx